This is a list of schools in Perlis, Malaysia. It is categorised according to the variants of schools in Malaysia, and is arranged alphabetically.

Private schools 
Harvest Academy (International)
Sekolah Rendah Islam At Taqwa (SRI AT TAQWA)
Sekolah Rendah Islam 1 (SRI 1)
Sekolah Agama Al Islahiyah (Rendah) (SAIR)
Sekolah Rendah Agama At Tarbiyah Al Islamiyah (SRAATI)
 Ma'had Attarbiyah al-Islamiyah (MATRI)
 Sekolah Menengah Agama Al-Madrasah Al-Alawiyah Ad-Diniah (AL MAAD)
Sekolah Agama Al Islahiyah (Menengah) (SA AL ISLAHIYAH MENENGAH)

Islamic religious schools

Secondary education: Sekolah Menengah Kebangsaan Agama (SMKA) 
 Sekolah Menengah Kebangsaan Agama (P) Kangar 

 Sekolah Menengah Kebangsaan Agama Arau

National schools

Primary education: Sekolah Kebangsaan (SK) 
 Sekolah Kebangsaan Dato' Kayaman
 Sekolah Kebangsaan Behor Empiang
 Sekolah Kebangsaan Abi
 Sekolah Kebangsaan Kuala Perlis
 Sekolah Kebangsaan Padang Besar (Selatan)
 Sekolah Kebangsaan Padang Melangit
 Sekolah Kebangsaan Simpang Empat
 Sekolah Rendah Kebangsaan Seri Indera
 Sekolah Kebangsaan Stella Maris
 Sekolah Kebangsaan Sungai Baru
 Sekolah Kebangsaan Utan Aji
 Sekolah Kebangsaan Jejawi
 Sekolah Kebangsaan Beseri
 Sekolah Kebangsaan Paya
 Sekolah kebangsaan Sungai Berembang
 Sekolah Kebangsaan Santan
 Sekolah Kebangsaan Kampung Salang
 Sekolah Kebangsaan Batu Bertangkup
 Sekolah Kebangsaan Behor Mali
 Sekolah Kebangsaan Arau
 Sekolah Kebangsaan Bintong
 Sekolah Kebangsaan Bukit Keteri
 Sekolah Kebangsaan Changkat Jawi
 Sekolah Kebangsaan Chuping
 Sekolah Kebangsaan Dato' Ahmad Musa
 Sekolah Kebangsaan Dato' wan Ahmad
 Sekolah Kebangsaan Felda Mata Ayer
 Sekolah Kebangsaan Felda Rimba Mas
 Sekolah Kebangsaan Guar Jentik
 Sekolah Kebangsaan Guar Nangka
 Sekolah Kebangsaan Jelempok
 Sekolah Kebangsaan Jalan Raja Syed Alwi
  Sekolah Kebangsaan Jalan Raja Syed Saffi
 Sekolah Kebangsaan Kampung Serdang
 Sekolah Kebangsaan Kayang
 Sekolah Kebangsaan Kubang Gajah
 Sekolah Kebangsaan LKTP Chuping
 Sekolag Kebangsaan Long Boh
 Sekolah Kebangsaan Lubuk Sireh
 Sekolah Kebangsaan Oran
 Sekolah Kebangsaan Padang Besar Utara
 Sekolah Kebangsaan Padang Keria
 Sekolah Kebangsaan Padang Kota
 Sekolah Kebangsaan Panggas
 Sekolah Kebangsaan Panggau
 Sekolah Kebangsaan Pauh
 Sekolah Kebangsaan Pendidikan Khas
 Sekolah Kebangsaan Putra
 Sekolah Kebangsaan Raja (P) Budriah
 Sekolah Kebangsaan Sanglang
 Sekolah Kebangsaan Seberang Ramai
 Sekolah Kebangsaan Sena
 Sekolah Kebangsaan Seri Perlis
 Sekolah Kebangsaan Seri Tunjung
 Sekolah Kebangsaan Sungai Baru
 Sekolah Kebangsaan Tambun Tulang
 Sekolah Kebangsaan Tengku Budriah
 Sekolah Kebangsaan Titi Tinggi
 Sekolah Kebangsaan Titi Tok Bandar
 Sekolah Kebangsaan Ujung Batu

Secondary education: Sekolah Menengah Kebangsaan (SMK)

Chinese Type Primary and Secondary School

Chinese Primary School
SJK (C) CHIN HUN
SJK (C) CHOON SIEW 
SJK (C) HWA AIK
SJK (C) KHAY BENG
SJK (C) KHOON AIK
SJK (C) KONG AIK
SJK (C) KONG HWA 
SJK (C) PADANG BESAR (U)
SJK (C) SIMPANG AMPAT
SJK (C) SIN MIN

SMJK School
SEKOLAH MENENGAH JENIS KEBANGSAAN PERLIS

Technical school Sekolah Menengah Teknik (SMT)
 Sekolah Menengah Teknik Arau ???- Sekolah Vokasional Arau
 Sekolah Menengah Teknik Kangar ???- Sekolah Vokasional Kangar

Boarding School 
Harvest Academy (International)
 Maktab Rendah Sains MARA Beseri
 Sekolah Menengah Sains Tuanku Syed Putra
 Maktab Rendah Sains MARA Arau

See also 
 Education in Malaysia

References

Perlis